Rolpa may refer to:
Rolpa Airport
Rolpa Municipality
Rolpa District